"One of a Kind" is a song written by Billy Sherrill and Stephen Allen Davis, and recorded by American country music artist Tammy Wynette. It was released August 1977 as the first single from the album One of a Kind.

Background and reception
"One of a Kind" was first recorded in December 1976 at the Columbia Recording Studio in Nashville, Tennessee. Additional tracks were recorded during this session, which would ultimately become part of Wynette's studio album One of a Kind. The session was produced by Billy Sherrill and the song was issued as a single in August 1977.

The song reached number 6 on the Billboard Hot Country Singles chart. It released on her studio album One of a Kind.

Track listings
7" vinyl single
 "One of a Kind" – 2:54
 "Loving You, I Do" – 2:50

Charts

References 

1977 songs
1977 singles
Tammy Wynette songs
Song recordings produced by Billy Sherrill
Songs written by Billy Sherrill
Songs written by Stephen Allen Davis
Epic Records singles